David C. Huff (September 13, 1936–December 12, 2019) was an American politician who served as a Republican member of the Kansas House of Representatives from 1997 to 2006. He represented the 30th District and lived in Lenexa, Kansas. 

Huff was elected in 1996 and was re-elected for an additional 5 terms before declining to run for re-election in 2006. He was succeeded by fellow Republican Ron Worley.

References

1936 births
2019 deaths
Republican Party members of the Kansas House of Representatives
20th-century American politicians
21st-century American politicians
People from Lenexa, Kansas